Christian Van Manuel, also known as Christian Manuel Hayes, is an American politician who represents district 22 of the Texas House of Representatives. A member of the Democratic Party, he was sworn in on January 10, 2023.

Early life
Manuel was born in Nederland, Texas and raised in Port Arthur. His mother was an educator and his father worked with the U.S. Coast Guard.

Political career
Prior to holding public office, Manuel was chief of staff to Representative Joe Deshotel, his predecessor. Manuel worked for Deshotel for 18 years.

Manuel was elected in 2022, receiving 56.5% of the vote against Republican opponent Jacorian Randle. He was sworn in on January 10, 2023.

Personal life
Manuel is one of three openly gay black people in the 88th Texas legislature.

References

Living people
Texas Democrats
Year of birth missing (living people)
Place of birth missing (living people)
Members of the Texas House of Representatives
21st-century American politicians
LGBT state legislators in Texas
African-American state legislators in Texas
21st-century African-American politicians
African-American men in politics